Oleg Stanislavovich Tataurov (born 23 August 1972) is a Russian figure skating coach and former competitor who represented the Soviet Union and Russia. He won silver and bronze medals at the Grand Prix International St. Gervais and represented Russia at the 1994 Winter Olympics, where he placed 11th.

Personal life 
Tataurov was born on 23 August 1972 in Leningrad, Russian SFSR, Soviet Union.

Career 
Tataurov began skating in 1978. He was coached by Alexei Mishin in Saint Petersburg.

Tataurov took bronze at the 1990 Grand Prix International St. Gervais and silver a year later. He won the bronze medal at the 1991 Winter Universiade for the Soviet Union. After its dissolution, he represented Russia. He won several Russian national medals and was selected to compete at the 1994 Winter Olympics in Lillehammer, Norway. He finished 11th after placing 5th in the short program and 13th in the free skate.

Tataurov coaches at Yubileyny Sport Club in Saint Petersburg. He has coached the following skaters:
 Petr Gumennik
 Alexander Petrov
 Andrei Lazukin
 Alexei Krasnozhon (until 2014)

Competitive highlights 
GP: ISU Champions Series (Grand Prix)

References

 

Russian male single skaters
Soviet male single skaters
Olympic figure skaters of Russia
Figure skaters at the 1994 Winter Olympics
Figure skaters from Saint Petersburg
Universiade medalists in figure skating
Living people
1972 births
Universiade bronze medalists for the Soviet Union
Competitors at the 1991 Winter Universiade
Competitors at the 1994 Goodwill Games
Competitors at the 1997 Winter Universiade